WCLU may refer to:

 WCLU (AM), a radio station (1490 AM) licensed to serve Glasgow, Kentucky, United States
 WLLI (FM), a radio station (102.3 FM) licensed to serve Munfordville, Kentucky, which held the call sign WCLU-FM from 1998 to 2021